Lake Río Cuarto, is a fresh water crater lake located in the northern highlands of Costa Rica.

Location 

It is located in Río Cuarto canton, of Alajuela province.

Physical aspects 

The lake Río Cuarto is a maar lake located within a crater, it has an almost circular outline. There is no secondary volcanic activity present.

See also 
 List of lakes in Costa Rica

References 

Geography of Alajuela Province
Geography of Guanacaste Province
Tourist attractions in Alajuela Province
Tourist attractions in Guanacaste Province
Rio Cuarto